Hinterland is the fifth studio album by electronic instrumentalist William Orbit, which released under the alias Strange Cargo. It is the fourth in a series of similarly themed albums: Strange Cargo, Strange Cargo II, and Strange Cargo III.

Track listing
 "Million Town"
 "She Cries Your Name"
 "Montok Point" (with Joe Frank)
 "Hulaville"
 "Kiss of the Bee"
 "El Ninjo"
 "Crimes of the Future"
 "The Name of the Wave"
 "Say Anything"
 "Lost in Blue"
 "Hinterland"
 "The Last Dream of Lucy Mariner"

Use in other media
"The Name of the Wave" was used in the soundtrack of the documentary Amy (2015) about the late singer-songwriter Amy Winehouse. It is the only track in the film neither by Winehouse herself nor by film composer Antônio Pinto, who scored the film.

References

1995 albums
William Orbit albums
Albums produced by William Orbit
Sequel albums